Hydrangea is a genus of flowering plants.

Hydrangea may also refer to:

, a ship
, a ship
Hydrangea (horse) (foaled 2014), an Irish Thoroughbred racehorse

See also

 Hortensia (disambiguation)